The 2012 Fort Lauderdale Strikers season was the second season of the team in the North American Soccer League, and the entire club's thirty-eighth season in professional soccer.  This year, the team finished fifth in the regular season and made it to the quarterfinals in the playoffs.

Squad information

Current roster

Squad breakdown
Updated May 16, 2012.

Transfers

In

Out

Competitions

Preseason

NASL regular season

Standings

Results summary

Results by round

Match results

U.S. Open Cup

NASL Playoffs

International call-ups

Squad statistics

NASL league matches

Players

Goalkeepers

U.S. Open Cup

Players

Goalkeepers

NASL Playoffs

Players

Goalkeepers

Top scorers
Includes all competitive matches. The list is sorted by shirt number when total goals are equal.

{| class="wikitable" style="font-size: 95%; text-align: center;"
|-
!width=15|
!width=15|
!width=15|
!width=15|
!width=150|Name
!width=130|NASL
!width=120|U.S. Open Cup
!width=90|Playoffs
!width=80|Total
|-
||1
|20
|MF
|
|Mark Anderson
|11
|2
|0
|13
|-
||2
|15
|FW
|
|Aly Hassan
|6
|3
|0
|9
|-
||3
|26
|FW
|
|Andy Herron
|8
|0
|0
|8
|-
||4
|10
|MF
|
|Walter Restrepo
|6
|1
|0
|7
|-
||5
|9
|FW
|
|Abe Thompson
|4
|0
|1
|5
|-
||6
|11
|FW
|
|Polo Morales
|0
|2
|0
|2
|-
|rowspan=5|7
|8
|MF
|
|Pecka
|1
|0
|0
|1
|-
|16
|DF
|
|Lance Laing
|1
|0
|0
|1
|-
|21
|FW
|
|Darnell King
|1
|0
|0
|1
|-
|31
|FW
|
|Paulo Jr.
|1
|0
|0
|1
|-
|83
|DF
|
|Scott Gordon
|1
|0
|0
|1
|-
|colspan="4"|
|TOTALS
|40
|8
|1
|49

Club staff

{|class="wikitable"
|-
!Position
!Name
|-
|President|| Tim Robbie
|-
|Head coach|| Daryl Shore
|-
|Assistant coach & Goalkeeper Coach|| Ricardo Lopes
|-
|Player/Assistant Coach|| Abe Thompson
|-
|Head Athletic Trainer|| Joe Caroccio
|-
|Director of Operations|| Miguel Lopez
|-

Recognition

NASL Player of the Week

NASL Best XI
  Mark Anderson
  Walter Restrepo

References

External links
 Strikers Official site
 Flight 19 supporters group
 Miami FC Supporters Group 

2012
Fort Lauderdale Strikers
Fort Lau
2012 in sports in Florida